Billiards and snooker competitions at the 2021 Southeast Asian Games took place at Hà Đông District Sporting Hall in Hanoi, Vietnam from 16 to 22 May 2022.

Medal table

Medalists

Carom

Pool

Snooker

References

Billiards and snooker
2021